Louis Legendre  (born 16 February 1945) is a Canadian-trained oceanographer whose later career took him to France.

Education
Legendre degreed in liberal arts (B.A.) and sciences (B.Sc., Zoology) at the University of Montreal in 1964 and 1967, respectively. He degreed in oceanography (Ph.D.) at Dalhousie University (Halifax, Canada) in 1971.

Academic career
Legendre joined the faculty at Laval University in 1973, rising to full professor in 1981. In 2000, he joined the French National Centre for Scientific Research (CNRS), and was director of the Villefranche Oceanography Laboratory. In 2009, he took a position at the Pierre and Marie Curie University (as of 2018, Sorbonne University). He is a professor emeritus at Laval University and at Sorbonne University. 

He is a Fellow of the Royal Society of Canada and a Knight of the Order of Saint-Charles.

Select awards and honours 
 1985 – Prix Léo-Pariseau, ACFAS
 1986 – Michel-Jurdant Prize (with Pierre Legendre), ACFAS
 1988 – Fellow, Royal Society of Canada
 1997 – Prix Marie-Victorin, Government of Quebec
 1997 –  Honorary Doctorate, University of Liège, Belgium
 2001 – ECI Prize
 2002 – Fellow, International Ecology Institute
 2002 – G. Evelyn Hutchinson Award, Association for the Sciences of Limnology and Oceanography
 2011 – Knight, Order of Saint-Charles, Principality of Monaco
 2016 – Elected Fellow, European Academy of Sciences 
 2017 – Sustaining Fellow, Association for the Sciences of Limnology and Oceanography

Selected publications
Numerical Ecology (2012)

References

1945 births
Living people
Canadian oceanographers
Dalhousie University alumni
Fellows of the Royal Society of Canada
Knights of the Order of Saint-Charles
People from Montreal
Université de Montréal alumni
Academic staff of Université Laval
Foreign members of the Chinese Academy of Sciences